Noah Dobson (born January 7, 2000) is a Canadian professional ice hockey defenceman for the New York Islanders of the National Hockey League (NHL). He was selected 12th overall by the Islanders in the 2018 NHL Entry Draft.

Playing career
Dobson grew up playing hockey on Prince Edward Island (PEI), first skating when he was four-years-old. A skilled skater, he was given permission by Hockey PEI (the governing body of hockey on PEI) to enroll in organized hockey at a younger age than normal, and consistently played in older age groups. In 2014 Dobson left home to attend Bishop's College School in Lennoxville, Quebec, recruited to join their hockey team. He spent the 2014–15 season at the school, and considered moving to Toronto and joining the Don Mills Flyers of the Greater Toronto Hockey League, though ultimately was recruited join the academy of EC Red Bull Salzburg in Austria. He spent a season in Austria, living with former NHL player Brian Savage (whose son also joined Red Bull), before returning to Canada.

Dobson was drafted in the first round, sixth overall, in the 2016 QMJHL draft by the Acadie–Bathurst Titan. Considered one of the top defencemen in the league, Dobson was named to the 2017–18 QMJHL first All-Star team. He was also named the QMJHL defenceman of the month for the month of March after he finished the regular season tied for second place among defenceman in the league with 69 points. At the conclusion of the season, Dobson was nominated for the Emile Bouchard Trophy as the league's best defencemen. He was also nominated for the Michael Bossy Trophy and Kevin Lowe Trophy.

On June 22, 2018, Dobson was selected 12th overall by the New York Islanders in the 2018 NHL Entry Draft. On August 13, the Islanders signed Dobson to a three-year, entry-level contract.

In the 2018–19 season, Dobson was selected as the Titans team captain. Having scored 16 points in 28 games for the rebuilding Titans, Dobson was traded to the Rouyn-Noranda Huskies during the 2019 World Junior Championships. With the Huskies, Dobson won his second consecutive Memorial Cup.

On October 2, 2019, Dobson officially made the Islanders roster for the 2019–20 NHL season. Dobson's first NHL game came on October 8, 2019, against the Edmonton Oilers, where he recorded his first NHL point with a primary assist on a goal by Matt Martin. On January 14, 2020, in his 18th NHL game, Dobson scored his first NHL goal against Calvin Pickard of the Detroit Red Wings.

During the 2021–22 season, Dobson recorded 51 points with 13 goals in 80 games played. On August 22, 2022, Dobson re-signed with the Islanders on a three-year deal.

International play

 

Dobson won a gold medal at the 2017 Ivan Hlinka Memorial Tournament.

Dobson represented Canada at the 2019 World Junior Ice Hockey Championships in Vancouver and Victoria. He scored one goal in the tournament, but his most notable involvement came in the quarterfinal against Finland, when his stick broke on a one-timer, and the Finns immediately rushed down the ice and scored, eliminating Canada.

Personal life
Dobson was born in Summerside, Prince Edward Island to Bathurst, New Brunswick natives Andrew and Jenny Dobson. He has one younger sister, Elly.

Dobson lived with former Islander Dennis Seidenberg during his rookie season, similar to teammate Mathew Barzal.

Career statistics

Regular season and playoffs

International

References

External links
 

2000 births
Living people
Acadie–Bathurst Titan players
Canadian ice hockey defencemen
Ice hockey people from Prince Edward Island
Bishop's College School alumni
National Hockey League first-round draft picks
New York Islanders draft picks
New York Islanders players
People from Summerside, Prince Edward Island
Rouyn-Noranda Huskies players